Edward Dye (7 August 1879 – 25 January 1942) was a New Zealand trade unionist and miner.

Dye was born in Timaru, and lived in Australia as a youth. He was president for twenty years of the Ohinemuri Miners' Union and the New Zealand Gold Mine Employees' Federation. Blacklisted after the 1912 Waihi miners' strike, he broke in a dairy farm from the bush for eight years before returning to the Waihi gold mines.

On 29 July 1937, Dye was elected a member of the Waihi Borough Council. He was re-elected for a further three years at the local elections the following year, but stood down at the 1941 local elections.
 
Dye was a member of the New Zealand Legislative Council, appointed by the Labour Government, from 9 March 1936 to 25 January 1942,  when he died from miner's phthisis.

References 

1879 births
1942 deaths
Members of the New Zealand Legislative Council
New Zealand Labour Party MLCs
People from Timaru
New Zealand trade unionists
New Zealand miners
New Zealand farmers
Deaths from lung disease
Local politicians in New Zealand